Massimo Pianforini (1890–1966) was an Italian film and television actor.

Selected filmography
 Doctor Antonio (1937)
 For Men Only (1938)
 The Count of Brechard (1938)
 The Knight of San Marco (1939)
 Heartbeat (1939)
 Rossini (1942)
 Malombra (1942)
 Daniele Cortis (1947)
 Les Misérables (1948)
 Devotion (1950)
 The Ungrateful Heart (1951)
 Too Young for Love (1953)
 Policarpo (1959)
 Il padrone delle ferriere (1959)
 The Giants of Thessaly (1960)

References

Bibliography
 Roy Kinnard & Tony Crnkovich. Italian Sword and Sandal Films, 1908–1990. McFarland, 2017.

External links

1890 births
1966 deaths
Italian male television actors
Italian male film actors
People from le Marche